Tariq Shabir Khan Mayo is a Pakistani politician who was elected to the National Assembly of Pakistan in 2010. Tariq took his seat for the Pakistan Peoples Party Parliamentarians in the NA-129 constituency of Lahore.

References

Politicians from Lahore
Living people
Year of birth missing (living people)